Valle de Sedano is a municipality located in the province of Burgos, Castile and León, Spain. According to the 2004 census (INE), the municipality has a population of 541 inhabitants.

Villages
Sedano
 Cortiguera 
 Cubillo del Butrón 
 Escalada
 Gredilla de Sedano
 Huidobro
 Moradillo de Sedano 
 Nidáguila  
 Nocedo 
 Orbaneja del Castillo 
 Pesquera de Ebro
 Quintanaloma 
 Quintanilla Escalada
 Terradillos de Sedano 
 Turzo 
 Valdelateja

See also
Páramos
Valle del Rudrón

References

Municipalities in the Province of Burgos